WMLO-LP (97.1 FM) is a radio station licensed to Live Oak, Florida, United States.  The station is currently owned by Melody Christian Radio.

References

External links
 

MLO-LP
MLO-LP